Rasika Fernando (born 25 January 1984) is a Sri Lankan cricketer. He made his Twenty20 debut on 17 August 2004, for Panadura Sports Club in the 2004 SLC Twenty20 Tournament. He made his first-class debut for Panadura Sports Club in the 2004–05 Premier League Tournament on 22 October 2004.

References

External links
 

1984 births
Living people
Sri Lankan cricketers
Hambantota District cricketers
Kalutara Physical Culture Centre cricketers
Panadura Sports Club cricketers
Place of birth missing (living people)